Acaster South Ings is a Site of Special Scientific Interest, or SSSI, near York, England. It consists of two alluvial flood-meadows, and was designated in 1988 because it supports diverse fauna and flora, some of which is rare in the Vale of York area. One of the rarities is the tansy beetle, which feeds on the leaves of the tansy plant.

Site location and designation
Acaster South Ings is a  biological Site of Special Scientific Interest (SSSI), consisting of "two large alluvial flood-meadows." Such wet grasslands are considered rare in the United Kingdom due to contemporary "drainage and agricultural improvement." The site is accessed on foot via a public footpath along the Ouse riverbank, from Acaster Malbis via Acaster Marine.

The SSSI was first notified in 1988, and is classified under a wildlife enhancement scheme, due to the presence of grasslands containing rare plant and insect life. It is one of nine wildlife SSSIs in the Greater York area, the other designated sites being Strensall Common, Heslington Tilmire, Askham Bog, Fulford Ings, Naburn Marsh, Church Ings, Derwent Ings and River Derwent. It is one of four riverside hay meadow SSSIs listed by the Yorkshire Dales Rivers Trust, alongside Clifton Ings and Rawlcliffe Meadows, Fulford Ings and Naburn Marsh.

Significant site content

Flora
There are grasses such as great burnet, cock's-foot, creeping bent, meadow foxtail, Yorkshire fog and crested dog's tail.

Flowering plants covering the flood meadow include meadow vetchling, ox eye daisy, common sorrel, red clover, creeping thistle, meadowsweet, ribwort plantain and meadow buttercup. There are "distinct stands throughout the grassland" of common bistort, and some areas which contain common meadow rue, and pepper saxifrage.

The site is protected, by earth dykes, from potential flooding from the adjacent River Ouse. These dykes provide plant habitat which is drier than the flood meadows. Some plants which prefer this drier habitat are meadow cranesbill, field mouse ear and clustered bellflower. Along the riverside are trees and shrubs such as osier and hawthorn, and plants taller than those in the meadows, including tansy, butterbur, common mugwort, reed canary grass and great willowherb.

Fauna
There are two beetles which are protected here. The rare tansy beetle feeds on the leaves of the tansy plant, and Aphthona nigriceps (a flea beetle) lives on meadow cranesbill. Other insects here are scarab beetle Hoplia philanthus, red soldier beetle, pollen beetle and plant bug Leptoterna flavilabris. The curlew, a wading bird, breeds here. This is "one of few suitable breeding areas for waders" in the Vale of York, so dog walkers are advised to keep dogs on leads during the spring breeding season.

Maintenance
"Active management" is required, to conserve the above flora and fauna. Farming practices for the protection of the above species are: "continuation of traditional management for haycropping followed by aftermath grazing in late summer to early autumn." To prevent tall growth and to avoid build-up of decayed vegetation, the fields are cut or mowed in early July after the curlews have bred and the protected plants have set seed. Grazing animals are removed in autumn. There is "regular and careful maintenance of surface drainage including ditches and drains." The condition of the site is described by Natural England as "unfavourable - recovering." The unfavourable condition was specified as "unfavourable development" in Hansard in 2004.

Development and risk assessment
In 2018 the company Renewables First assessed the area for potential effects of the proposed Naburn Weir Hydroelectric Project. The assessment document concluded that the development was "not expected to have an adverse impact on the nearby SSSIs."

Notes

References

External links

Sites of Special Scientific Interest in North Yorkshire
Sites of Special Scientific Interest notified in 1988